Oak Point is a city in Denton County, Texas, United States.  Ranked in the Top 20 of 62 suburbs in the Dallas area by D Magazine, Oak Point had a population of 2,786 at the 2010 census.

Geography

Oak Point is located at  (33.182353, –96.995192).

Demographics

According to the U.S. Census' Quick Facts, the population in the 2010 Census was 2,786; in the 2020 Census was 4,357; and the July 2021 estimate was 5,557. The age distribution of the 2020 population included 26.9% of the population under the age 18, and 14.8% with an age of 65 or over. The racial distribution of the 2020 population:  81.0% was White alone, 16.1% was Hispanic or Latino, 5.1% was Black or African American, and 2.6% was Asian alone.   In 2020, there were nearly 300 veterans in the City.
There was 1,912 households with average 2.66 persons per household in 2020 and 84.3% of housing units were owner occupied.

Government and infrastructure 
The City of Oak Point was incorporated as a general law municipality in 1976.  The City of Oak Point adopted the Council-Manager form of government through an election in May 2001.  The Council-Manager form of government is a very common form of government in Texas.  Under this form of government, the City Council employs a professional trained city manager to implement the policies, contracts, and agreements that are approved by the City Council.  The City Manager is also responsible for managing the daily operations of the City and for implementing the City's budget.  
In November 2022, the new City Charter was approved overwhelmingly by the residents and the city changed to charter-based Home Rule form of city government.  The new Charter keeps the City Manager form of government and adds a councilperson, for a total of 6 councilpersons.  All councilpersons are elected at large, as well as the Mayor.  The Mayor has full voting rights (cannot make or second motions), so as to provide full accountability.  Terms are for 2 years, with staggered elections each year in May.  Other improvements are included in the full Charter, which can be found at the city website.   https://www.oakpointtexas.com/

Education
The City of Oak Point is served by the Little Elm and Denton Independent School Districts.

Little Elm ISD residents are zoned to Oak Point Elementary School. Since 2020, said residents are zoned to Walker Middle School. Prior to 2020 these residents were zoned to Lakeside Middle School. All LEISD residents are zoned to Little Elm High School.

Providence Elementary School serves most of Denton ISD Oak Point, while a section is zoned to Cross Oaks Elementary School. All of the Denton ISD portion is zoned to Rodriguez Middle School, and Braswell High School.

The majority of Denton County, Oak Point included, is in the boundary of North Central Texas College.

References

External links
 City of Oak Point official website
 Oak Point in the Handbook of Texas

Dallas–Fort Worth metroplex
Cities in Texas
Cities in Denton County, Texas
Populated places established in 1976